The elm cultivar Ulmus 'Hertfordensis Angustifolia' was mentioned (as Ulmus campestris hertfordensis angustifolia) by Boulger in Gardener's Chronicle II. 12: 298 1879, but without description.

Description
Loudon earlier described it as "the narrow leaved Hertfordshire Elm" in Arboretum et Fruticetum Britannicum, 3: 1396 1838. Considered "probably Ulmus carpinifolia" (:U. minor) by Green. Loudon also distinguished a broad-leaved Hertfordshire elm, U. 'Hertfordensis Latifolia'.

Pests and diseases
Though susceptible to Dutch Elm Disease, field elms (see Green's conjecture above) produce abundant suckers and usually survive in this form in their area of origin.

Cultivation
The Woodland Trust records a small number of mature U. minor surviving in Hertfordshire.

Synonymy
Ulmus campestris hertfordensis angustifolia: Boulger,  in Gardener's Chronicle II. 12: 298, 1879

References

Elm cultivars
Ulmus articles missing images
Ulmus